The 2007–08 Women's EHF Cup was the 27th edition of the competition, running from 31 August 2007 to 24 May 2008. Dynamo Volgograd followed the steps of the previous edition's champion Zvezda Zvenigorod as the second Russian club to win the competition, beating SD Itxako in the final.

First qualifying round

Second qualifying round

Round of 32

Round of 16

Quarter-finals

Semifinals

Final

References

Women's EHF Cup
EHF Cup Women
EHF Cup Women